Time Being, The Time Being, or For the Time Being may refer to:
 Time Being (Peter Erskine album), 1993
 Time Being (Ron Sexsmith album), 2006
 Time Being (Trio 3 album), 2006
 The Time Being, a 2012 American mystery film
 For the Time Being, a poem by W. H. Auden published in 1944
 For the Time Being (Annie Dillard), a 2009 nonfiction book
 For the Tyme Being, a 2008 mixtape by Shing02